The Cowlitz Glacier is on the southeast flank of Mount Rainier in the U.S. state of Washington. An adjacent glacier, the Paradise Glacier, is connected to this glacier on its southwest margin. As it flows down the slopes of Mount Rainier it nearly meets up with the Ingraham Glacier and during the Little Ice Age, which ended around the year 1850, the two glaciers shared a common terminus. Meltwater from the glacier drains into the Cowlitz River.

History
As the Ice Age ended the glacier retreated north back to Mount Rainier. In recent times, the glacier has retreated and thinned, except for the period between the mid-1970s and mid-1980s, during which the glacier made a notable advance.

See also
List of glaciers in the United States

References

Glaciers of Mount Rainier
Glaciers of Washington (state)